This article contains records and statistics for the Japanese professional football club, Omiya Ardija.

J.League

Domestic cup competitions

Top scorers by season

References

Omiya Ardija
Omiya Ardija